The Team relay competition at the 2021 FIL World Luge Championships was held on 31 January 2021.

Results
The race was started at 13:30.

References

Team relay